Christina Cindrich (born August 26, 1981) is an American television producer, host, and actress, of Italian and Croatian descent. She is the producer and host of Private Islands and Global Passport and has won four Emmy Awards.

Filmography

References

External links
 
 
 

1981 births
Living people
21st-century American actresses
Actresses from Pittsburgh
American television actresses
American film actresses
American people of Croatian descent
American television hosts
Television producers from Pennsylvania
American women television producers
Emmy Award winners
American women television presenters